Eric Furlatt (born December 2, 1971 in Trois-Rivières, Quebec) is an NHL referee, wearing number 27.  Furlatt began his NHL refereeing career on October 8, 2001 at the Philadelphia Flyers at Columbus Blue Jackets game.  A member of the NHL Officials' Association since September 1, 1998, Furlatt has refereed more than 1,000 games at the NHL level as of February.2017.

References
NHLOA Biography

1971 births
Canadian ice hockey officials
Ice hockey people from Quebec
Living people
National Hockey League officials